Joe McCleery was an Irish football manager.  He was the first manager of Derry City F.C. upon their entry into the Irish League in 1929. Prior to this he had been manager of Dundalk.

References

Year of birth missing
Year of death missing
Dundalk F.C. managers
Derry City F.C. managers
Republic of Ireland football managers